Kurt Stendal (19 February 1951 – 21 August 2019) was a Danish footballer who played as a midfielder. He was born in Frederiksberg.

References

External links
 
 
 

1951 births
2019 deaths
Danish men's footballers
Association football midfielders
Hvidovre IF players
SK Sturm Graz players
Denmark international footballers
Sportspeople from Frederiksberg